My Best Friend's Breakfast is a 2022 Taiwanese romantic comedy film written and directed by Ryan Tu in his directorial debut. The film stars Moon Lee and Eric Chou, and is based on a bestselling novel by Misa which has been published in many languages. The novel, in turn, was inspired by a shared story that first appeared on social media platform Dcard in 2015. The film was released in theaters on January 28, 2022.

Cast
 Moon Lee as Xiang Wei-xin
 Eric Chou as Tao You-quan
 Edison Song as Chang Yuan-shuo
 Jean Ho as Fang Qi-ran
 Lou Jun-shuo as Guan Hao-wei
 Lin He-syuan as Tang Zhong-xian
 Ko Cheng as He Bao-long
 Hung Yu-ching as Ye Ke-ya
 Chen Shu-fang as Grandma
 Sara Yu as Mom
 Patty Lee as Older Xiang Wei-xin
 Austin Lin as Older Tao You-quan
 Darren Chiu as Xiang Yi-da
 Esther Liu as Sun Li-qing
 Alex Chou as Class union president
 Beatrice Fang as Food outlet owner
 Bella Wu as Young Xiang Wei-xin
 Andy Chen as Swimming teammate
 Aaron Hong as Noodle store customer

Reception
James Marsh of South China Morning Post gave the film 2 out of 5 stars and described it as a "high-school romcom populated by awkward, inarticulate teens and stuffed with misunderstandings and misconceptions that could be remedied by a single conversation", and which "has very limited appeal" and "only young fans of its fresh-faced cast are likely to enjoy [the film]".

Awards and nominations

References

External links
 
 

2022 films
2022 romantic comedy films
Taiwanese romantic comedy films
2020s Mandarin-language films
Taiwanese-language films
Films based on Taiwanese novels
Taiwanese high school films
2022 directorial debut films